Samuel Austin Kendall (November 1, 1859 – January 8, 1933) was a Republican member of the U.S. House of Representatives from Pennsylvania.

Biography
Samuel A.  Kendall was born in Greenville Township, Pennsylvania.  He attended the public schools and was a student for some time at Valparaiso, Indiana, and at Mount Union College in Alliance, Ohio.  He taught school from 1876 to 1890 and served five years as superintendent of the public schools of Jefferson, Iowa.  He returned to Somerset County, Pennsylvania, in 1890 and engaged in the lumber business and the mining of coal.  He was vice president of the Kendall Lumber Co. of Pittsburgh, and president of the Preston Railroad Co.  He served as member of the Pennsylvania State House of Representatives from 1899 to 1903.

Kendall was elected as a Republican to the Sixty-sixth and to the six succeeding Congresses and served until his death.  He had been unsuccessful for reelection in 1932, and died of a self-inflicted gunshot wound in the House Office Building in Washington, D.C., before his successor J. Buell Snyder was sworn in.  Interment in Hochstetler Cemetery, Greenville Township, Somerset County, Pennsylvania.

See also 
 List of United States Congress members who died in office (1900–49)

References

Sources 
 
 The Political Graveyard

External links
 

Republican Party members of the Pennsylvania House of Representatives
Schoolteachers from Iowa
People from Somerset County, Pennsylvania
American politicians who committed suicide
University of Mount Union alumni
Suicides by firearm in Washington, D.C.
1859 births
1933 suicides
Republican Party members of the United States House of Representatives from Pennsylvania
People from Valparaiso, Indiana
People from Jefferson, Iowa
Educators from Pennsylvania
Educators from Indiana